HMS Director was a 64-gun third rate ship of the line of the Royal Navy, launched on 9 March 1784 at Gravesend. She was laid down speculatively in November 1779, and ordered by the Navy the following year.

In 1797 Director was under the command of Captain William Bligh. In early 1797 he surveyed the Humber, preparing a map of the stretch from Spurn to the west of Sunk Island. In May, the crew mutinied during the Nore mutiny. The mutiny was not triggered by any specific actions by Bligh. On 12 October she took part in the Battle of Camperdown, where she captured the Dutch commander, Vice-Admiral Jan de Winter, and his flagship, Vrijheid.

Fate
Director was decommissioned in July 1800 and broken up at Chatham in January 1801.

Notes

References

Lavery, Brian (2003) The Ship of the Line - Volume 1: The development of the battlefleet 1650-1850. Conway Maritime Press. .
Winfield, Rif (2005) British Warships in the Age of Sail 1793-1817 - Design, Construction, Careers and Fates. Conway Maritime Press. .

External links
 

Ships of the line of the Royal Navy
St Albans-class ships of the line
1784 ships
Ships built in Gravesend